Aberdeenshire is one of the 32 council areas of Scotland.

It takes its name from the County of Aberdeen, which has substantially different boundaries. The Aberdeenshire Council area includes all of the area of the historic counties of Aberdeenshire and Kincardineshire (except the area making up the City of Aberdeen), as well as part of Banffshire. The county boundaries are officially used for a few purposes, namely land registration and lieutenancy.

Aberdeenshire Council is headquartered at Woodhill House, in Aberdeen, making it the only Scottish council whose headquarters are located outside its jurisdiction. Aberdeen itself forms a different council area (Aberdeen City). Aberdeenshire borders onto Angus and Perth and Kinross to the south, Highland and Moray to the west and Aberdeen City to the east.

Traditionally, it has depended economically on the primary sector (agriculture, fishing, and forestry) and related processing industries. Over the last 40 years, the development of the oil and gas industry and associated service sector has broadened Aberdeenshire's economic base, and contributed to a rapid population growth of some 50% since 1975. Its land represents 8% of Scotland's overall territory.

History

Aberdeenshire has a rich prehistoric and historical heritage. It is the locus of a large number of Neolithic and Bronze Age archaeological sites, including Longman Hill, Kempstone Hill, Catto Long Barrow and Cairn Lee. The area was settled in the Bronze Age by the Beaker culture, who arrived from the south around 2000–1800 BC. Stone circles and cairns were constructed predominantly in this era. In the Iron Age, hill forts were built. Around the 1st century AD, the Taexali people, who have left little history, were believed to have resided along the coast. The Picts were the next documented inhabitants of the area and were no later than 800–900 AD. The Romans also were in the area during this period, as they left signs at Kintore. Christianity influenced the inhabitants early on, and there were Celtic monasteries at Old Deer and Monymusk.

Since medieval times, there have been many traditional paths that crossed the Mounth (a spur of mountainous land that extends from the higher inland range to the North Sea slightly north of Stonehaven) through present-day Aberdeenshire from the Scottish Lowlands to the Highlands. Some of the most well-known and historically important trackways are the Causey Mounth and Elsick Mounth.

Aberdeenshire played an important role in the fighting between the Scottish clans. Clan MacBeth and the Clan Canmore were two of the larger clans. Macbeth fell at Lumphanan in 1057. During the Anglo-Norman penetration, other families arrive, such as House of Balliol, Clan Bruce, and Clan Cumming (Comyn). When the fighting amongst these newcomers resulted in the Scottish Wars of Independence, the English king Edward I travelled across the area twice, in 1296 and 1303. In 1307, Robert the Bruce was victorious near Inverurie. Along with his victory came new families, namely the Forbeses and the Gordons.

These new families set the stage for the upcoming rivalries during the 14th and 15th centuries. This rivalry grew worse during and after the Protestant Reformation when religion was another reason for conflict between the clans. The Gordon family adhered to Catholicism and the Forbeses to Protestantism. Aberdeenshire was the historic seat of the clan Dempster. Three universities were founded in the area prior to the 17th century, King's College in Old Aberdeen (1494), Marischal College in Aberdeen (1593), and the University of Fraserburgh (1597).

After the end of the Revolution of 1688, an extended peaceful period was interrupted only by fleeting events such as the Rising of 1715 and the Rising of 1745. The latter resulted in the end of the ascendancy of Episcopalianism and the feudal power of landowners. An era began of increased agricultural and industrial progress. During the 17th century, Aberdeenshire was the location of more fighting, centred on the Marquess of Montrose and the English Civil Wars. This period also saw increased wealth due to the increase in trade with Germany, Poland, and the Low Countries.

The present council area is named after the historic county of Aberdeenshire, which has different boundaries and was abandoned as an administrative area in 1975 under the Local Government (Scotland) Act 1973. It was replaced by Grampian Regional Council and five district councils: Banff and Buchan, Gordon, Kincardine and Deeside, Moray and the City of Aberdeen. Local government functions were shared between the two levels. In 1996, under the Local Government, etc. (Scotland) Act 1994, the Banff and Buchan District, Gordon District, and Kincardine and Deeside District were merged to form the present Aberdeenshire Council area. Moray and the City of Aberdeen were made their own council areas. The present Aberdeenshire Council area consists of all of the historic counties of Aberdeenshire and Kincardineshire (except the area of those two counties making up the City of Aberdeen), as well as the north-east portions of Banffshire.

Demographics
Aberdeenshire's population has increased by 9.1% since 2001, while Scotland's total population grew by  3.8%.
The census lists a relatively high proportion of under 16s and slightly fewer working-age people compared with the Scottish average.

Aberdeenshire is one of the most homogeneous/indigenous regions of the UK. In 2011, 82.2% of residents identified as 'White Scottish', followed by 12.3% who are 'White British', whilst ethnic minorities constitute only 0.9% of the population. The largest ethnic minority group are Asian Scottish/British at 0.8%. In addition to the English language, 48.8% of residents reported being able to speak and understand the Scots language.

The fourteen biggest settlements in Aberdeenshire (with 2011 population estimates) are:

Peterhead (17,790)
Fraserburgh (12,540)
Inverurie (11,529)
Westhill (11,220)
Stonehaven (10,820)
Ellon (9,910)
Portlethen (7,327)
Banchory (7,111)
Turriff (4,804)
Kintore (4,476)
Huntly (4,461)
Banff (3,931)
Kemnay (3,830)
Macduff (3,711)

Economy
Aberdeenshire's Gross Domestic Product (GDP) is estimated at £3,496M (2011), representing 5.2% of the Scottish total. Aberdeenshire's economy is closely linked to Aberdeen City's (GDP £7,906M), and in 2011, the region as a whole was calculated to contribute 16.8% of Scotland's GDP. Between 2012 and 2014, the combined Aberdeenshire and Aberdeen City economic forecast GDP growth rate is 8.6%, the highest growth rate of any local council area in the UK and above the Scottish rate of 4.8%.

A significant proportion of Aberdeenshire's working residents commute to Aberdeen City for work, varying from 11.5% from Fraserburgh to 65% from Westhill.

Average Gross Weekly Earnings (for full-time employees employed in workplaces in Aberdeenshire in 2011) are £572.60. This is lower than the Scottish average by £2.10 and a fall of 2.6% on the 2010 figure. The average gross weekly pay of people resident in Aberdeenshire is much higher, at £741.90, as many people commute out
of Aberdeenshire, principally into Aberdeen City.

Total employment (excluding farm data) in Aberdeenshire is estimated at 93,700 employees (Business Register and
Employment Survey 2009). The majority of employees work within the service sector, predominantly in public administration, education and health. Almost 19% of employment is within the public sector. Aberdeenshire's economy remains closely linked to Aberdeen City's and the North Sea oil industry, with many employees in oil-related jobs.

The average monthly unemployment (claimant count) rate for Aberdeenshire in 2011 was 1.5%. This is lower than the average rate of Aberdeen City (2.3%), Scotland (4.2%) and the UK (3.8%).

Major industries

 Energy – There are significant energy-related infrastructure, presence and expertise in Aberdeenshire. Peterhead is an important centre for the energy industry. Peterhead Port includes an extensive new quay with an adjacent laydown area at Smith Quay, is a major support location for North Sea oil and gas exploration and production and the fast-growing global sub-sea sector. The Gas Terminal at St Fergus handles around 15% of the UK's natural gas requirements, and the Peterhead power station is looking to host Britain's first carbon capture and storage power generation project. There are numerous offshore wind turbines near the coast.
 Fishing – Aberdeenshire is Scotland's foremost fishing area. In 2010, catches landed at Aberdeenshire's ports accounted for over half the total fish landings in Scotland and almost 45% in the UK. Along with Aberdeen City, Peterhead and Fraserburgh ports provide much employment in these sectors. The River Deeis also rich in salmon.
 Agriculture – Aberdeenshire is rich in arable land, with an estimated 9,000 people employed in the sector, and is best known for rearing livestock, mainly cattle. Sheep are important in the higher ground.
 Tourism – this sector continues to grow, with a range of sights to be seen in the area. From the lively Cairngorm Mountain range to the bustling fishing ports on the northeast coast, Aberdeenshire samples a bit of everything. Aberdeenshire also has a rugged coastline, many sandy beaches and is a hot spot for tourist activity throughout the year. Almost 1.3 million tourists visited the region in 2011 – up 3% on the previous year.
 Whisky distilling is still a practised art in the area.

Governance and politics
Aberdeenshire Council is headquartered at Woodhill House, in Aberdeen.
The council has 70 councillors, elected in 19 multi-member wards by single transferable vote. The 2022 elections resulted in the following representation:

The overall political composition of the council following the 2022 election is as follows:

The council's Revenue Budget for 2012/13 totals approx £548 million. The Education, Learning and Leisure Service takes the largest share of budget (52.3%), followed by Housing and Social Work (24.3%), Infrastructure Services (15.9%), Joint Boards (such as Fire and Police) and Misc services (7.9%) and Trading Activities (0.4%).
21.5% of the revenue is raised locally through the Council Tax. Average Band D Council Tax is £1,141 (2012/13), no change on the previous year.
The current chief executive of the council is Jim Savege and the elected Council Leader is Jim Gifford. Aberdeenshire also has a provost, who is Councillor Bill Howatson.

The council has devolved power to six area committees: Banff and Buchan; Buchan; Formartine; Garioch; Marr; and Kincardine and Mearns. Each area committee takes decisions on local issues such as planning applications, and the split is meant to reflect the diverse circumstances of each area. (Boundary map)

In the 2014 Scottish independence referendum, 60.36% of voters in Aberdeenshire voted for the Union, while 39.64% opted for independence.

Notable features

The following significant structures or places are within Aberdeenshire:

Balmoral Castle, Scottish Highland residence of the British royal family.
Bennachie
Burn O'Vat
Cairness House
Cairngorms National Park
Corgarff Castle
Crathes Castle
Causey Mounth, an ancient road
Drum Castle
Dunnottar Castle
Fetteresso Castle
Fowlsheugh Nature Reserve
Haddo House
Herscha Hill
Huntly Castle
Kildrummy Castle
Loch of Strathbeg
Lochnagar
Monboddo House
Muchalls Castle
Pitfour estate
Portlethen Moss
Raedykes Roman Camp
River Dee
River Don
Sands of Forvie Nature Reserve
Slains Castles, Old and New
Stonehaven Tolbooth
Ythan Estuary Nature Reserve

Hydrology and climate

There are numerous rivers and burns in Aberdeenshire, including Cowie Water, Carron Water, Burn of Muchalls, River Dee, River Don, River Ury, River Ythan, Water of Feugh, Burn of Myrehouse, Laeca Burn and Luther Water. Numerous bays and estuaries are found along the seacoast of Aberdeenshire, including Banff Bay, Ythan Estuary, Stonehaven Bay and Thornyhive Bay. Aberdeenshire has a marine west coast climate on the Köppen climate classification.  Aberdeenshire is in the rain shadow of the Grampians, therefore it has a generally dry climate for a maritime region, with portions of the coast receiving  of moisture annually. Summers are mild, and winters are typically cold in Aberdeenshire; Coastal temperatures are moderated by the North Sea such that coastal areas are typically cooler in the summer and warmer in winter than inland locations. Coastal areas are also subject to haar, or coastal fog.

Notable residents

John Skinner, (1721–1807) author, poet and ecclesiastic. Penned the famous verse, "Tullochgorum".
Hugh Mercer, (1726–1777), born in the manse of Pitsligo Kirk, near Rosehearty, brigadier general of the Continental Army during the American Revolution.
Alexander Garden, (1730–1791), born in Birse, was a noted naturalist and physician. He moved to North America in 1754 and discovered two species of lizards. He was a Loyalist during the American Revolutionary War, which led to the confiscation of his property and his banishment in 1782. The gardenia flower is named in his honour.
John Kemp, (1763–1812), born in Auchlossan, was a noted educator at Columbia University who is said to have influenced DeWitt Clinton's opinions and policies.
George MacDonald (1824–1905), author, poet, and theologian born and raised in Huntly.
Dame Evelyn Glennie, DBE, born and raised in Ellon on 19 July 1965, is a virtuoso percussionist and the first full-time solo percussionist in 20th-century western society. She is very highly regarded in the Scottish musical community and has proven that her profound deafness does not inhibit her musical talent or day-to-day life.
Evan Duthie, (born 2000), an award-winning DJ and producer. 
Peter Nicol, MBE, born in Inverurie on 5 April 1973, is a former professional squash player who represented first Scotland and then England in international squash.
Peter Shepherd, (1841–1879), Surgeon Major, Royal Army Medical Corps
Johanna Basford (born 1983), illustrator and textile designer
Iona Fyfe (born 1998), award-winning Scots singer and musician.

References

External links

Aberdeenshire Council
Aberdeenshire Tourist Guide
Aberdeenshire Libraries Service
Aberdeenshire Museums Service
Peterhead and Buchan Tourism Web Site
Aberdeenshire Arts
Aberdeenshire Sports Council

 
Council areas of Scotland